Maithils (Tirhuta: মৈথিল, Devanagari: मैथिल), also known as Maithili people, are an Indo-Aryan ethno-linguistic group from the Indian subcontinent, who speak the Maithili language as their native language. They inhabit the Mithila region, which comprises North Bihar and parts of Jharkhand in India and some adjoining districts of Nepal constituting Madhesh Province.
The Maithil region forms an important part of Hinduism as it is said to be the birthplace of Sita, the wife of Ram and incarnation of Lakshmi.

History

Vedic period
Mithila first gained prominence after being settled by Indo-Aryan speaking peoples who established the Videha kingdom.
During the late Vedic period (c. 1100–500 BCE), Videha became one of the major political and cultural centers of South Asia, along with Kuru and Pañcāla. The kings of the Videha Kingdom were called Janakas.

The Videha Kingdom later became incorporated into the Vajjika League which was based in Mithila.

Medieval period
From the 11th century to the 20th century, Mithila was ruled by various indigenous dynasties. The first of these were the Karnatas, who were of Maithil Kshatriya origin, the Oiniwar dynasty, who were Maithil Brahmins, and the Khandavalas of Raj Darbhanga, who were also Maithil Brahmins.
It was during this period that the capital of Mithila was shifted to Darbhanga.

Maithili-speaking dynasties and kingdoms
Karnat dynasty, 1097 CE–1324 CE 
Oiniwar dynasty, 1325 CE–1526 CE
Raj Darbhanga, 1557 CE −1947 CE
Malla dynasty, 1201 CE-1779 CE
Senas of Makwanpur, 1518 CE –1762 CE
Banaili

Region

India
Majority of Maithils normally reside north of the Ganges; based around Darbhanga and the rest of North Bihar. 
Native Maithili speakers also reside in Delhi, Kolkata, Patna, Ranchi and Mumbai.

Indian Mithila comprises Tirhut, Darbhanga, Kosi, Purnia, Munger, Bhagalpur and Santhal Pargana divisions.

Darbhanga in particular played an important role in the history of Mithila and is considered one of its "core centers". It was the center of Raj Darbhanga who ruled most of the region.
Madhubani was also where Madhubani paintings originated from which is a major part of Maithil culture.
Sitamarhi is claimed by many to be the birthplace of Goddess Sita with Sita Kund being a major pilgrimage site. Baliraajgadh, situated in present-day Madhubani district,  is thought to be the capital of ancient Mithila Kingdom.
Maithils played a major role in building the Baidyanath Temple which is an important pilgrimage site for them.
There is an ongoing movement in the Maithili speaking region of Bihar and Jharkhand for a separate Indian state of  Mithila.

Nepal
The adjoining districts of the eastern Terai form Nepalese Mithila. This area was part of the kingdom of Videha. The kingdom appears in the Ramayana. Many people claim Janakpur to be the birthplace of Goddess Sita but this is disputed as many consider Sitamarhi as Her birthplace.
Maithils in Nepal have been working towards a "Free Maithil state".

There is a movement in the Maithili speaking areas of Nepal for a separate province. Province No. 2 was established under the 2015 Constitution, which transformed Nepal into a Federal Democratic Republic, with a total of 7 provinces. Province No. 2 has a Maithili speaking majority and consists most of the Maithili speaking areas of Nepal. It has been demanded by some Mithila activists that Province No. 2 be named 'Mithila Province'. Province no. 2 was given the name Madhesh Province on 17 January 2022.

Ethnicities and castes
Many ethnic groups and castes inhabit the Mithila region including Maithil Brahmins, Rajputs, Bhumihars, Kayasthas, Ahirs, Kurmis, Koeris, Baniyas, Muslims and many more.

Maithil Brahmins are the Hindu Brahmin community of the Mithila region. They are one of the five Pancha-Gauda Brahmin communities. They are also noted for panjis, the extensive genealogical records maintained for the last twenty-four generations.

Maithil Rajputs are scattered throughout the region and are divided into various sub-clans with the most prominent being the Gandhawarias who ruled estates mainly in Saharsa and Madhepura. The Hindus of Mithila maintain social and marital relations with Hindus of other regions.

Language

The common language of Maithil people is Maithili, which is one of the recognised regional languages  of India and the second national language of Nepal listed in the Eighth Schedule of the Indian Constitution and the Interim Constitution of Nepal. The Tirhuta script, also known as the Mithilakshar script, was used as the original script of the language. However, during the 20th century most Maithili writers gradually adopted Devanagari script for Maithili. Some traditional pandits still use Tirhuta script for pātā (ceremonial letters related to important functions, such as marriage).

Culture

The most striking aspects of their environment are the decorated rice containers, colorfully painted verandahs and outer walls of their homes using only available materials like clay, mud, dung and grass. Much of the rich design is rooted in devotional activities and passed on from one generation to the next, occasionally introducing contemporary elements such as a bus or an airplane.

Household structure
Traditionally Maithils lived in Badaghars called longhouses with big families of many generations, sometimes 40–50 people. All household members pool their labor force, contribute their income, share the expenditure and use one kitchen.

Religion 
The religious practices of the Maithils is based on orthodox Hinduism as Mithila has historically been a principal seat of Hindu learning.

Politics
Maithils hold significant influence in the politics of both India and Nepal. They dominate the polity of Bihar, India's third most populous state, by virtue of their majority in 144 of the 243 constituencies of the Bihar Legislative Assembly. Maithils are the largest ethnolinguistic group in the Nepalese Madhesh Province and the second largest ethnolinguistic group in Province No. 1.

Cross-border regionalism
Mithila regionalism      unites Maithils of India and Maithils of Nepal from both sides of international border. Since they share a common history, language, culture, and  ethnicity, they feel part of one Mithila. Positive events on one side of the international border are celebrated on the other side, and negative events are mourned on both sides.

Notable people 

Ramdhari Singh Dinkar- Great Hindi poet ,freedom fighter , essayist, Rashtrakavi
Nand Kishore Singh- Chairman, 15th Finance Commission & Former IAS
Sushant Singh Rajput- Indian actor
 Dr. (Hon) Aditya Jha - Global Entrepreneur & Philanthropist
 Harisimhadeva – King of Mithila during the Karnata dynasty.
 King Janaka – king of the Videha kingdom
 Sita – wife of the Hindu figure Ram
 Vidyapati – Maithili poet and a Sanskrit writer
 Gopal Jee Thakur - BJP leader and Member of Parliament from Darbhanga
 Anand Mohan Singh- former Member of Parliament
 Kirti Azad – former Indian cricketer and politician from Darbhanga
 Bindhyabasini Devi – folk singer
 Kranti Prakash Jha – Bollywood actor and model
 Narendra Jha – Bollywood actor
 Sriti Jha – Bollywood actor
Bhavna Kanth – One of the first female pilots of India
Kanhaiya Kumar, Indian politician
 Udit Narayan – Bollywood playback singer
 Pravesh Mallick – Bollywood music director
 Sanjay Mishra – Bollywood actor
 Kameshwar Singh Bahadur – the last zamindar of Raj Darbhanga in India
 Sharda Sinha – Maithili folk singer
 Jyotirishwar Thakur – Maithili poet and writer
 Gangesha Upadhyaya – 12th-century Indian mathematician and philosopher 
 Bimalendra Nidhi – former Deputy Prime Minister of Nepal
 Ram Baran Yadav – former President of Nepal
 Tarkishore Prasad – Deputy Chief Minister of Bihar

See also
 History of Mithila Region 
 Culture of Mithila Region

References
Notes

Bibliography

Social groups of Bihar
Madhesi people
Ethnic groups in India
Hindu ethnic groups
Ethnic groups in Nepal
Ethnic groups divided by international borders
Indo-Aryan peoples
Linguistic groups of the constitutionally recognised official languages of India
Madhesh Province